The 38th Brigade was an infantry brigade formation of the British Army that was active during World War I. It was composed of volunteers of Kitchener's Army and served in the Gallipoli and Mesopotamian campaigns.

History
38th Brigade was organised as part of 13th (Western) Division, which  came into existence as a result of Army Order No 324 of 21 August 1914 authorising the formation of six new volunteer infantry divisions (the 'First Kitchener Army' or 'K1'). The division was organised by Western Command and the brigades began to assemble on Salisbury Plain.

Composition
The following units served with the brigade:
 6th (Service) Battalion, King's Own (Royal Lancaster Regiment)
 6th (Service) Battalion, East Lancashire Regiment
 6th (Service) Battalion, Prince of Wales's Volunteers (South Lancashire Regiment)
 6th (Service) Battalion, Loyal North Lancashire Regiment
 38th Machine Gun Company (joined 24 October 1916)
 38th Supply and Transport Column, Army Service Corps (January 1917 – 1 August 1918)
 38th Trench Mortar Battery ('G' Battery joined from 39th Brigade on 7 October 1917; renamed 38th Battery on 18 February 1918)
 38th Small Arms Ammunition Section (joined by March 1918)

Service
The brigade sailed from Avonmouth in June 1915 and landed on the Gallipoli Peninsula in July. It was evacuated to Egypt in December 1915. In February 1916 it moved to Mesopotamia and fought in that theatre until the end of the war.  It was disbanded in 1919.

Later formation
See main article: British 38th (Irish) Infantry Brigade
In January 1942 38th Brigade was reformed by converting 210th Independent Infantry Brigade (Home) into a frontline formation. It was composed of  Irish battalions and was titled 38th (Irish) Brigade. It fought with distinction through the Tunisian and Italian campaigns of World War II.

38 (Irish) Brigade was reformed yet again in 2007 as a component of the present-day British Army.

Notes

References
 
 The Long, Long Trail

Military units and formations established in 1914
Infantry brigades of the British Army
Infantry brigades of the British Army in World War I